Vicente García de Mateos Rubio (born 19 September 1988 in Manzanares, Ciudad Real) is a Spanish cyclist, who currently rides for UCI Continental team . His brother Raúl García de Mateos is also a professional cyclist.

Major results

2006
 2nd Time trial, National Junior Road Championships
2010
 3rd Overall Cinturó de l'Empordà
2013
 4th Overall Tour de Hokkaido
 10th Tour de Okinawa
2014
 4th Vuelta a La Rioja
2015
 1st Stage 1 Volta a Portugal
 4th Overall GP Internacional do Guadiana
 10th Overall GP Liberty Seguros
2016
 3rd Overall GP Liberty Seguros
1st Points classification
 7th Vuelta a La Rioja
 8th Overall Volta a Portugal
1st Stage 5
2017
 1st Clássica Aldeias do Xisto
 3rd Overall Volta a Portugal
1st  Points classification 
1st Stage 8
 3rd Trofeo Serra de Tramuntana
 4th Clássica da Arrábida
 6th Overall Troféu Joaquim Agostinho
 10th Trofeo Porreres-Felanitx-Ses Salines-Campos
 10th Trofeo Andratx-Mirador des Colomer
2018
 3rd Overall Volta a Portugal
1st  Points classification
1st Stages 2, 8 & 10
 9th Trofeo Lloseta-Andratx
2019
 2nd Overall GP Beiras e Serra da Estrela
 5th Overall Vuelta a Asturias
 10th Overall Vuelta a la Comunidad de Madrid
 10th Overall Volta ao Alentejo
2020
 3rd Road race, National Road Championships
2022
 4th Clássica da Arrábida

References

External links

1988 births
Living people
Spanish male cyclists
Sportspeople from the Province of Ciudad Real
Cyclists from Castilla-La Mancha